Tabernaemontana arborea is a species of plant in the family Apocynaceae. It is found in southern Mexico, Central America, and Colombia.

References

arborea